Horná Ves may refer to several places in Slovakia:

Horná Ves, Prievidza District
Horná Ves, Žiar nad Hronom District